Kematen am Innbach is a municipality in the district of Grieskirchen in the Austrian state of Upper Austria.

Geography
Kematen lies in the Hausruckviertel. About 16 percent of the municipality is forest, and 73 percent is farmland.

References

Cities and towns in Grieskirchen District